The Buick Straight 6 was an engine manufactured by Buick from 1914–1930 and was exclusively used in the Buick Six platform, then later in the Buick Master Six and Buick Standard Six. They were OHV, like their previous engines, as Buick had been almost exclusively using overhead valve engines since the Model B in 1904. The engine also had the starter and generator in a single unit. The first six cylinders engine was cast in pairs (3x2 cylinders). The 224 and 242 CID did not have a removable cylinder head, meaning the cylinders and valves came off as a unit, (although with the valves in cages, the cages were removable individually), and pistons had to come out of the bottom of the unit as it was removed. This was colloquially called a "jughead" engine, since the jugs (cylinders) came off with the head. Since 1924, all engines had a removable head. They had a displacement ranging from  depending on year and model. In 1925 the series was divided into the lower priced Buick Standard Six and the high-end Buick Master Six series. The Buick Straight-8 engine replaced the straight 6 across the board in all models, in 1931, and was the basis of the Holden straight-six motor.

References

 Slauson, H. W.; Howard Greene (1926). "Leading American Motor Cars”. Everyman’s Guide to Motor Efficiency. New York: Leslie-Judge Company.

Buick engines
Automobile engines